Bandi Narayanswamy is a Telugu writer, novelist and a teacher. He won the Sahitya Akademi Award in 2019 for his novel Saptabhoomi. He published the novel in 2017 and got the Telugu Association of North America Award for the same.

Early life and career 
He was born on 3 June 1952 in Anantapur to an agricultural family. He studied at the PG Center in Sri Venkateswara University.

After completing his education, he worked as a teacher for various government primary and high schools in remote villages.

His other novels are Rendu Kalala Desam, Meerajyam Meerelandi and Gaddalaadatandayi.

References

1952 births
Living people
Writers from Andhra Pradesh
People from Rayalaseema
People from Anantapur district
Recipients of the Sahitya Akademi Award in Telugu
Telugu people
Indian writers
21st-century Indian male writers
21st-century Indian writers